Mornflake is a British brand of oat and oat-based breakfast cereals launched in 1941 in Crewe, Cheshire.

History 
The Mornflake brand was first launched in 1941 by the Lea family at the height of World War II. The family had an existing oat milling business dating back to 1675 and the current managing director, John Lea, is a direct descendant of the original founder. The company is one of the oldest companies in the UK and is one of Crewe’s larger employers alongside Bentley Motors.

Mornflake Oats is the official shirt sponsor of football teams Crewe Alexandra F.C. and Altrincham F.C. In June 2021, Crewe agreed a £500,000 naming rights deal with Mornflake; its Gresty Road ground will be called the "Mornflake Stadium" until 2023–24.

Products

Porridge oats 
 Creamy Superfast Oats
 Gluten Free Jumbo Oats
 Gluten Free Porridge Oats
 Organic Superfast Oats
 Organic Oats
 Scottish Jumbo Oats
 Whole Jumbo Oats

Oatbran 
 Nuts & Seeds Heart Healthy Oatbran Granola
 Original Heart Healthy Oatbran
 Original Heart Healthy Oatbran Flakes
 Very Berry Heart Healthy Oatbran Flakes

Oatmeal 
 Stoneground Oatmeal Fine (Grade 40)
 Stoneground Oatmeal Medium (Grade 70)
 Steel Cut Oatmeal Coarse

Muesli 
 Crispy Muesli Fruity
 Crispy Muesli Date & Fig
 Crispy Muesli Fruit, Nut & Seed
 Crispy Muesli Nutty
 Classic Muesli Fruit
 Classic Muesli Fruit & Nut
 Original Heart Healthy Oatbran Flakes
 No Added Sugar Swiss Style Muesli

Granola 
 Crunchy Granola Hawaiian
 Crunchy Granola Orchard
 Crunchy Granola Original
 Nuts & Seeds Heart Healthy Oatbran Granola
 Classic Muesli Fruit
 Classic Muesli Fruit & Nut
 Original Heart Healthy Oatbran Flakes
 No Added Sugar Granola Fruit, Nut & Seed
 No Added Sugar Granola Simply Oat

Porridge sachets 
 Instant Porridge Golden Syrup Sachets
 Instant Porridge Original Sachets

Breakfast cereal 
 Chocolatey Squares

References

External links
Mornflake
HJ Lea Oakes

1675 establishments in England
Companies established in 1675
Breakfast cereals
Breakfast cereal companies
Companies based in Cheshire
Oats
Food manufacturers of England